"Steady Rollin" is an iTunes single released by the San Francisco band, Two Gallants, and was the first European 7" single from What the Toll Tells.

This single is the 92nd release of Saddle Creek Records.

Track listing for (iTunes) and Compact disc
 "Steady Rollin'"
 "Dappens "
 "Don't Want No Woman Who Stays Out All Night Long"

Track listing (Vinyl)
 "Steady Rollin'"
 "Dappens "

Other appearances
Acoustic 07 (2007, V2 Records)

External links
Two Gallants official website
Saddle Creek Records

Two Gallants (band) songs